Arthur Gaeth (1905-1984) was the first president of a mission of the Church of Jesus Christ of Latter-day Saints in Czechoslovakia starting in 1929. He was serving as a Mormon missionary in Germany when he was called to open the mission in Czechoslovakia. This was the church's first established mission in a Slavic country.

Although Gaeth had been raised in the United States, his mother had been born in Undangs which was in Czechoslovakia following World War I (although it had been in Austria-Hungary when she was born there).

The mission was able to open because of the liberal democracy that prevailed in Czechoslovakia in the interwar years. After having served as mission president for two years he received permission from John A. Widtsoe, the overall president of LDS missions in Europe at the time, to Marry. He found a suitable Czech bride, Martha Kralickova, who was studying in Chicago, who he baptized. They went to Salt Lake City where they were sealed on 23 March 1931, with John A. Widtsoe performing the ceremony. Martha was exposed to the Relief Society and other auxiliaries of the church during a three-month stay in Salt Lake City, during which she also became a good friend of Leah Widtsoe, wife of John. When they returned to Czechoslovakia a few months later his wife had the responsibility of running these auxiliaries in that nation.

Gaeth served as president of the Czechoslovak Mission until 1936.

Notes

Further reading

References
 Materials relating to Arthur Gaeth at Brigham Young University
Church News, March 3, 1990

External links
Materials relating to Arthur Gaeth at the L. Tom Perry Special Collections, Harold B. Lee Library, Brigham Young University.

Mission presidents (LDS Church)
American Mormon missionaries in Germany
20th-century Mormon missionaries
American Mormon missionaries in Czechoslovakia
American people of Czechoslovak descent
American leaders of the Church of Jesus Christ of Latter-day Saints
1905 births
1984 deaths